The 1995 Colorado Springs mayoral election took place on April 4, 1995 to elect the mayor of Colorado Springs, Colorado. The election was held concurrently with various other local elections. The election was officially nonpartisan. It saw the reelection of incumbent mayor Robert M. Issac to a fifth term.

Results

References

1995
1995 Colorado elections
1995 United States mayoral elections